Miss India Worldwide 2001 was the 11th edition of the international beauty pageant. The final was held in Durban, South Africa on  March 9, 2001. About 14 countries were represented in the pageant. Sarika Sukhdeo  of South Africa crowned as the winner at the end of the event.

Results

Special awards

Delegates
 – Stephanie Singh
 – Anurithi Chikkerpur
 – Tejal Patel
 – Hiral Shah
 – Mohanaapriya Sina Raja
 – Marilyn Ahelia Sewbalak
 – Priya Isaac
 – Krisstel Martin
 – Sarika Sukhdeo
 – Tricia Bhim
 – Ekta Bhatt
 – Nova Krishnan
 – Parveen Sian
 – Stacy Isaa

References

External links
http://www.worldwidepageants.com/

2001 beauty pageants